Dymond Simon (born September 29, 1989) is a professional basketball player, most recently for the Phoenix Mercury of the Women's National Basketball Association.

Arizona State statistics

Source

References

External links
 WNBA stats

1989 births
Living people
American expatriate basketball people in Australia
American expatriate basketball people in Croatia
American women's basketball players
Arizona State Sun Devils women's basketball players
McDonald's High School All-Americans
Parade High School All-Americans (girls' basketball)
Phoenix Mercury players
Point guards
Basketball players from Phoenix, Arizona
Undrafted Women's National Basketball Association players